Kamil Majchrzak was the defending champion but chose not to defend his title.

Aslan Karatsev won the title after defeating Oscar Otte 6–4, 6–2 in the final.

Seeds

Draw

Finals

Top half

Bottom half

References

External links
Main draw
Qualifying draw

Prosperita Open - Singles
2020 Singles